David Segal may refer to:

 David R. Segal, American sociologist
 David Segal (athlete) (born 1937), British athlete
 David Segal (politician) (born 1979), American politician in Rhode Island
 David Segal (reporter), The New York Times columnist and author of "The Haggler"
 David HaLevi Segal (c. 1586–1667), Polish rabbinical authority

See also
David Siegel (disambiguation)